The Cabinet McAllister was the state government of the German state of Lower Saxony from 1 July 2010 to 19 February
2013. The Cabinet was headed by Minister President David McAllister. After the election of Christian Wulff as president of Germany, McAllister was elected and sworn in as Minister President by the Landtag of Lower Saxony on 15 December 1999

It is notable for being the first modern cabinet in Germany headed by a person holding dual citizenship (German and British), although Germany, its states and its various predecessors have previously had many politicians of foreign, including French, Polish, Italian and Slovene, ancestry.

Composition 

|}

Notes

External links
The Lower Saxony state government

McAllister
2010 establishments in Germany
2013 disestablishments in Germany